William Patrick Kenney (January 10, 1870 – January 24, 1939) was a president of the Great Northern Railway.

Biography
He was born on January 10, 1870, in Watertown, Wisconsin.

As a boy in Minneapolis, Kenney delivered newspapers.  He used a goat to pull his wagonload of papers until the neighbors objected to the smell and the goat was sold to a rancher in Montana.  Later, Kenney joined the Great Northern Railway, which needed a trademark.  He suggested the image of the goat to James J. Hill, the "Empire Builder" who ran the railroad, and it was adopted.

In 1931, he was vice president and director of traffic at the Great Northern Railway. He replaced Ralph Budd as president on January 1, 1932.

He died at St. Joseph's Hospital in St. Paul, Minnesota, on January 24, 1939.

References

External links

1870 births
1939 deaths
People from Watertown, Wisconsin
20th-century American railroad executives
Great Northern Railway (U.S.)